The  records in swimming are the fastest ever performances of swimmers from Kuwait, which are recognised and ratified by the Kuwait Swimming Association (KSA).

All records were set in finals unless noted otherwise.

Long Course (50 m)

Men

Women

Short Course (25 m)

Men

Women

References

External links
KSA official website

Kuwait
Records
Swimming
Swimming